Deflagration  (Lat: de + flagrare, "to burn down") is subsonic combustion in which a pre-mixed flame propagates through a mixture of fuel and oxidizer. Deflagrations can only occur in pre-mixed fuels. Most fires found in daily life are diffusion flames. Deflagrations with flame speeds in the range of 1 m/sec differ from detonations which propagate supersonically through shock waves with speeds in the range of 1 km/sec.

Applications
Deflagrations are often used in engineering applications when the goal is to move an object such as a bullet in a firearm, or a piston in an internal combustion engine with the force of the expanding gas. Deflagration systems and products can also be used in mining, demolition and stone quarrying via gas pressure blasting as a beneficial alternative to high explosives.

Flame physics
The underlying flame physics can be understood with the help of an idealized model consisting of a uniform one-dimensional tube of unburnt and burned gaseous fuel, separated by a thin transitional region of width  in which the burning occurs. The burning region is commonly referred to as the flame or flame front. In equilibrium, thermal diffusion across the flame front is balanced by the heat supplied by burning.

Two characteristic timescales are important here. The first is the thermal diffusion timescale , which is approximately equal to

,

where  is the thermal diffusivity. The second is the burning timescale  that strongly decreases with temperature, typically as

,

For a stationary moving deflagration front, these two timescales must be equal: the heat generated by burning is equal to the heat carried away by heat transfer. This makes it possible to calculate the characteristic width  of the flame front:

,

thus

.

Now, the thermal flame front propagates at a characteristic speed , which is simply equal to the flame width divided by the burn time:

.

This simplified model neglects the change of temperature and thus the burning rate across the deflagration front. This model also neglects the possible influence of turbulence. As a result, this derivation gives only the laminar flame speed—hence the designation .

Damaging events

Damage to buildings, equipment and people can result from a large-scale, short-duration deflagration.  The potential damage is primarily a function of the total amount of fuel burned in the event (total energy available), the maximum flame velocity that is achieved, and the manner in which the expansion of the combustion gases is contained.

In free-air deflagrations, there is a continuous variation in deflagration effects relative to the maximum flame velocity.  When flame velocities are low, the effect of a deflagration is to release heat, such as in a flash fire.  At flame velocities near the speed of sound, the energy released is in the form of pressure and the resulting high pressure can damage equipment and buildings.

See also

 Conflagration
 Deflagration to detonation transition
 Pressure piling

References

Combustion
Explosives
Physical chemistry